The German Shorthaired Pointer (GSP) is a medium to large sized breed of pointing dog developed in the 19th century in Germany for hunting. A versatile hunting breed, being an all-purpose gun dog suitable for both land and water, they are streamlined yet powerful with strong legs. A hunting breed that retains a strong drive to find and chase game, they are extremely energetic and can excel at a wide variety of dog sports. Their demeanor when well-socialized is friendly toward both people and fellow canines, with some tendency to be "velcro dogs".

The German Shorthaired Pointer has a short coat that comes in various combinations, generally a mix of liver and white. They have moderately long floppy ears set high on the head. Longer, broad, and strong, muzzles allow retrieval of heavier game. The dog's profile should be straight or strongly Roman nosed; any dished appearance to the profile is incorrect according to breed standards. Their eyes are generally brown, with darker eyes being desirable; yellow or "bird of prey" eyes are a fault. The tail is commonly docked, although this is now prohibited in some countries. In competition they are penalized if the tail is curved either up or down while the dog is moving. When the GSP is in classic point stance, the tail should be held straight out from the body, forming a line with the pointing head and body. Like all German pointers, GSPs have webbed feet  and are known for going after waterfowl in the water.

The German Shorthaired Pointer is a member of the Sporting Group. In 2016, CJ, a 3-year-old German Shorthaired Pointer, won the Best in Show award at the 140th Westminster Kennel Club Dog Show.

Appearance

The German Shorthaired Pointer's coat is short and flat with a dense undercoat protected by stiff guard hairs, making the coat water resistant and allowing the dog to stay warm in cold weather. This allows the German Shorthaired Pointer to be an agile hunter with high performance in both field and water. The color can be a dark brown with some lighter brown colors, referred to as "liver" (incorrectly as "chocolate" or "chestnut"), black (although any area of black is cause for disqualification in American Kennel Club-sanctioned shows), white, liver roan, or liver and white. Commonly, the head is a solid or nearly solid color, and the body is speckled or "ticked" with liver and white, sometimes with large patches of solid color called "saddles." Roan coats are also common, with or without patching. Solid liver and solid black coats also occur, often with a small blaze of ticking or white on the chest. While the German standard permits a slight sandy colouring ("Gelber Brand") at the extremities, this colouring is rare, and a dog displaying any yellow colouring is disqualified in AKC and CKC shows. The colouring of the GSP provides camouflage in the winter seasons. The coat can be very glossy if washed.

The GSP coat is easy to take care of, but they shed a lot. Although their coat is short, they do shed. They shed more at certain times throughout the year. If that isn't taken care of their hairs can be embedded in fabrics and carpet and it will be difficult to get it out. All it takes is to brush regularly with a firm bristle brush, along with baths when necessary.

Temperament

The temperament of dogs can be affected by different factors, including heredity, training, and socialization. The German Shorthaired Pointer was developed to be a dog suited for family life, as well as a versatile hunter. Therefore, its temperament is that of an intelligent, bold, playful, and characteristically affectionate dog that is cooperative and easily trained.  

These dogs love interaction with humans and are suitable pets for active families who will give them an outlet for their considerable energy. The GSP is usually good with children, although care should be taken because the breed can be boisterous, especially when young. The German Shorthaired Pointer needs a very high level of vigorous activity and thrives with much exercise and running. This need for exercise, coupled with the breed's natural instinct to hunt, means that training is an absolute necessity to achieve a well-behaved family dog. The GSP's distinctly independent character means that any unused energy will likely result in the dog amusing itself, most probably in an undesirable manner. Failure by the owner to give this active and intelligent dog sufficient exercise and/or proper training can produce a German Shorthaired Pointer that appears hyperactive or that has destructive tendencies. These dogs are athletic and can escape from four- to six-foot enclosures with little difficulty. 

Most German Shorthaired Pointers make excellent watchdogs, as they are naturally a very vocal dog. The breed generally gets along well with other dogs, but a strong hunting instinct is normal for the breed, which is not always good for other small pets such as cats or rabbits.

Health

Most German Shorthaired Pointers are tough, healthy dogs, but the breed can be subject to a number of hereditary disorders due to their breeding. Some of these health disorders include, hypothyroidism, hip dysplasia, osteochondrosis dissecans (OCD), pannus, progressive retinal atrophy (PRA), epilepsy, skin disorders and cancerous lesions in the mouth, on the skin and other areas of the body.  As with other breeds, un-spayed female GSPs are prone to breast cancer. This risk is reduced if they are spayed.

A genetic form of lupus, termed exfoliative cutaneous lupus erythematosus (ECLE) has also been recognized in German shorthaired pointer dogs. Lupus in dogs is a disease in which the immune system attacks the body's own cells and tissue. The disease is often present within 16 and 40 weeks of age. If diagnosed the life span of the dog is about four years.

Many factors, like genetics, environment, and diet can all contribute to hip dysplasia, which is a deformity of the hip joint. Not all German shorthaired pointers will develop displasia, but as the disease is determined by multi-genetic factors, only an OFA X-ray and screening by a qualified veterinary practitioner will determine whether the condition is present. No amount of exercise will correct it, and care should be taken to prevent slippage on smooth flooring. In severe cases, surgical correction may be required. Like many other deep-chested dogs, German shorthaired pointers are highly prone to gastric dilatation volvulus (GDV), also known as bloat. This is a life-threatening condition, requiring immediate veterinary treatment. GDV occurs especially if the dog is fed one large meal a day, eats rapidly, drinks large amounts of water after eating, or exercises vigorously after eating. In GDV, the stomach distends with gas or air and then twists (torsion), so that the dog is unable to rid the excess air in stomach through burping or vomiting. Also, the normal return of blood to the heart is impeded, causing a drop in blood pressure and the dog will go into shock. Without immediate medical attention, the dog may die. Some symptoms of GDV are: distended abdomen, excessive salivation, retching without throwing up, restlessness, depression, lethargy, and weakness. Precautions against GVD include: refraining from feeding immediately before or after exercise, feeding several smaller meals throughout the day instead of a single large meal, and avoiding the consumption of large amounts of water with dry food.

As with any other hunting dog, contact with game can cause the spread of fungi and bacteria that can easily colonise in the gums or cause infections on open wounds and small cuts from scratching against plants and bushes during a regular hunting session.

Care

German Shorthaired Pointers along with other sporting dogs requires much exercise and space to run. GSPs are one of the most energetic breeds. Therefore, if not given the right amount of attention, they can become bored and destructive. GSPs do not do well left alone all day or if relegated to a kennel with little human interaction.

GSPs are a very clean breed. The short GSP coat needs very little grooming, just occasional brushing. They typically shed constantly. GSPs should only be bathed when needed. Like all dogs with flop ears, GSP can be prone to ear infections and their ears require regular checking and cleaning.

The GSP has a median lifespan of 9 years in a Danish survey and 12 years in a UK survey. In the UK survey about 1 in 8 lived to >15 years with the longest lived dog living to 17 years.

As the GSP is a medium/large, active breed, the dogs can require considerable food. Older or less active GSPs can also become obese if fed more than suitable for the individual's activity levels. A healthy weight should permit the last two ribs to be felt under the coat and the dog should have a distinct waist or "tuck-up".

Due to the short GSP coat, body heat management is not generally a problem. However, the GSP's high levels of activity require the breed to drink considerable amounts of water to prevent dehydration. Early symptoms of dehydration show itself as thick saliva and urine with an excessively strong and distinct smell.

Training 
Early training is important for German Shorthair Pointer. The first year of having a GSP, it is best to make sure that they know the basics before teaching them other things. When training them, it is best to keep the lessons short but entertaining because they can get easily distracted. It is best to make sure they get their exercise in and then try some training. They are an intelligent breed and will learn quickly. They have much energy and need to be taken out daily so that they can relieve some of the energy.

History

German Hunters spent generations cross different breeds until the GSP came during the 1800s. They were very successful to the point that they are among the top-winning breeds in competitive hunting events. According to the American Kennel Club, it is likely that the GSP is descended from a breed known as the German Bird Dog, which itself is related to the Old Spanish Pointer introduced to Germany in the 17th century. It is also likely that various German hound and tracking dogs, as well as the English Pointer and the Arkwright Pointer also contributed to the development of the breed. However, as the first studbook was not created until 1870, it is impossible to identify all of the dogs that went into creating this breed. The breed was officially recognized by the American Kennel Club in 1930. World War II affected the breeding of GSP. Toward the end of the war many of the breeders hid their gold, diamonds, their GSPs and more. Then the best dogs were sent to Yugoslavia for safe keeping. Today the GSP ranks 19th among the 155 breeds and it varieties recognized by the AKC.

Current uses 
Like the other German pointers (the German Wirehaired Pointer and the less well-known German Longhaired Pointer), the GSP can perform virtually all gun dog roles. It is pointer and retriever, an upland bird dog and water dog. The GSP can be used for hunting larger and more dangerous game. It is an excellent swimmer but also works well in rough terrain. It is tenacious, tireless, hardy, and reliable. German Shorthaired Pointers are proficient with many different types of game and sport, including trailing, retrieving, and pointing pheasant, quail, grouse, waterfowl, raccoons, possum, and even deer.
German Shorthaired Pointers are still currently used as versatile hunting and gun dogs. With their high intelligence and athleticism the German Shorthaired Pointer performs well in many AKC sports such as Agility, Dock Diving, and Obedience. German Shorthaired Pointers are also used in law enforcement for nosework such as the detection of illicit substances.

In art and literature
Thomas Mann's great love for his German Shorthaired is told in the narrative Bashan and I.

Robert B. Parker's most popular mystery series features a Boston detective known only as Spenser who has had a series of three solid-liver German Shorthairs, all named Pearl: one who stood with him during a bear charge in his rural youth; one given to his girlfriend by her ex-husband; and the third Pearl, to keep company with Spenser and his girlfriend in their late middle age. Author Parker appears on many of the Spenser dust jackets with a solid-liver GSP male identical to the three incarnations of Pearl in the series.

Rick Bass's ruminations on living and hunting with a German Shorthaired Pointer in Montana can be found in the book Colter: The True Story of the Best Dog I Ever Had.

Sportswriter Mel Ellis' memoir Run, Rainey, Run, explores the extraordinary relationship he had with an extremely intelligent and versatile hunting German Shorthaired Pointer.

The 1978 film "Days of Heaven," written and directed by Terrence Malick, features a brief scene of dogs hunting the prairie. The GSP shown is Jocko von Stolzhafen, twice GSP National Champion (Field) and perhaps the best GSP of his era. A year or so later Jocko vanished while running at a training camp, presumably stolen.

The logo of the Westminster Kennel Club is a Pointer, not a German Shorthaired Pointer, though it is frequently mistaken for the latter.

See also

 Dogs portal
 List of dog breeds
 German Longhaired Pointer
 German Wirehaired Pointer

References

Further reading
 Alderton, David (1984). The Dog. Quill Publishing; Chartwell Books. .
 Barnes, Duncan (ed.) (1983). The AKC's World of the Pure-Bred Dog. Nick Lyons Books. .
 Brown, Joan (1996). Simon the Pointer. Viking US. .
 Cunliffe, Juliette (2004). The Encyclopedia of Dog Breeds. Parragon Publishing. .
 Ellis, Mel (1985). Run, Rainey, Run. Top Dogs: Northword Publishing. .
 Fogle, Bruce, DVM (2000). The new Encyclopedia of the Dog. Doring Kindersley (DK). .

 Marder, Amy, VMD (2004). The Complete Dog Owner's Manual. Fog City Press. .
Maxwell, C Bede (1982) "The New German Shorthaired Pointer" Howell Book House.  .
 Palmer, Joan (1994). The Illustrated Encyclopedia of Dog Breeds. Wellfleet Press. .
Rollston, Dr. Christopher A. "A Brief History of the German Shorthair (Deutsch Kurzhaar)."  _Shorthair Journal_ Volume 7 Issue 6 (2006):8-10.
 Schuler, Elizabeth Meriwether (ed.) (1980). Simon & Schuster's Guide to Dogs. Fireside: Simon and Schuster. .

External links

 
 
 German Shorthaired Pointer working on the field 
 German Shorthaired Pointer working in the water
 German Shorthaired Pointer blog with Migle Narbutaite
 

Dog breeds originating in Germany
FCI breeds
Gundogs
Pointers